The 2018 Winmau World Masters was a major tournament on the BDO/WDF calendar for 2018. It took place from 3–7 October at the Bridlington Spa Hall, which hosted the stage element of the event for the second time since 2009.

The event was the first time a BDO Major tournament had not been broadcast on television in 28 years after Eurosport decided to not renew the rights to the event. The event was streamed live on YouTube through the channel winmau TV 

Krzysztof Ratajski was the reigning men's champion after defeating Mark McGeeney in last year's final by 6 sets to 1, but switched to the PDC straight after last years event meaning he was excluded from taking part. Lorraine Winstanley was the defending women's champion after defeating Corrine Hammond in the final by 5 legs to 2, but she lost 4–0 in the quarter-finals to Casey Gallagher.

Adam Smith-Neale became the 2nd player in 2 years to win the event after starting at the first round (Seeds are given byes to the last 32) after Ratajski managed the same feat last year. He won his first major title by defeating two-time champion Glen Durrant 6–4 in the final.

Lisa Ashton won the Women's World Masters for the 2nd time with a 5–2 win over Casey Gallagher in the final.

Men's seeds
The seedings were finalised on 10 September. For the third consecutive year, there were 16 seeds (a decrease from 32 between 2012 and 2015) with all seeds exempt until the Last 32 stage and cannot play each other until the Last 16 stage.

Men's draw (last 48 onwards)

Women's seeds 
It was announced before the start of the event that the Ladies seeds were cut from 8 to 4 for unknown reasons. 

  Lorraine Winstanley (Quarter-finals)
  Lisa Ashton (Champion)
  Deta Hedman (Semi-finals)
  Anastasia Dobromyslova (Semi-finals)

Women's draw (last 8 onwards)

References

World Masters
World Masters
World Masters (darts)
Bridlington
2010s in the East Riding of Yorkshire